Gaston Chevrolet (4 October 1892 – 25 November 1920) was a French racecar driver and automobile manufacturer.

Early life
Born near Beaune, in the Côte-d'Or region of France where his Swiss parents had emigrated to a few years earlier, he was the younger brother of Louis (1878–1941, founder of the Chevrolet car company) and Arthur Chevrolet (1884–1946). After brother Louis emigrated to the United States and earned enough money, he sent for Gaston and Arthur to join him. Once there, Gaston worked as an automotive mechanic and joined his brothers in auto racing.

In 1916, the year after older brother Louis left the Chevrolet car company, Gaston Chevrolet became a partner with Louis and Arthur in the new Frontenac Motor Corporation.

Indianapolis 500
Driving a Frontenac race car, Chevrolet competed in the 1919 Indianapolis 500, finishing in tenth place while brother Louis finished seventh.

Chevrolet broke the dominance of European built cars in the 1920 Indianapolis 500, winning the race in a redesigned Monroe-Frontenac. In the process, he became the first driver in the history of the  race to go the distance without making a tire change. Gaston was unable to defend his win because of his death later that year. Chevrolet was the last Frenchman to win the Indianapolis 500 until Simon Pagenaud won the 2019 Indianapolis 500, 99 years after the 1920 race.

1920 National Championship and death
Following his May 31, 1920 victory at Indianapolis, Chevrolet raced in several more events.  He won a  match race against top racers Tommy Milton (driving a Chevrolet race car)  and Ralph Mulford.

With the coming of winter in late 1920, racing moved to the West Coast.  While competing in the last race of the season on the board track at the Beverly Hills Speedway, Chevrolet was killed when his Frontenac crashed on lap 146 of the 200 lap race. He connected with Eddie O'Donnell’s car and both cars tumbled down the embankment. Chevrolet died instantly along with O’Donnell’s riding mechanic while O’Donnell died the next day from a skull fracture. Despite the crash, Chevrolet had accumulated enough points during the race and through the season to win the 1920 title of "Speed King of the Year" (the AAA National Champion). Chevrolet is considered by accredited historians and contemporary accounts as the 1920 National Champion despite later revisionist publications retrospectively listing Tommy Milton as such.

Chevrolet is interred next to his brother Louis in the Holy Cross and Saint Joseph Cemetery in Indianapolis, Indiana.

Indy 500 results

Awards
He was inducted in the Motorsports Hall of Fame of America in 2002.

References

External links

 Gaston Chevrolet at ChevroletBrothers.com

1892 births
1920 deaths
French people of Swiss descent
Champ Car champions
Indianapolis 500 drivers
Indianapolis 500 winners
International Motorsports Hall of Fame inductees
People from Beaune
Racing drivers who died while racing
Sports deaths in California
AAA Championship Car drivers
Burials at Holy Cross and Saint Joseph Cemetery
Automotive businesspeople
French emigrants to the United States
French racing drivers
American people of Swiss descent
Sportspeople from Côte-d'Or